Sacred Space Music is the third album of new-age composer Constance Demby.

Track listing

Personnel 
Musical
 Constance Demby – hammered dulcimer, synthesizer, piano

Technical
 Recording & Engineering: Warren Dennis
 Additional engineering: Anna Turner
 Mixing: Stephen Hill
 Production: Constance Demby, Warren Dennis, Stephen Hill

Graphical
 Cover Illustration & Art direction: Constance Demby, Janaia Donaldson

External links 
 
 Sacred Space Music at Hearts of Space
 Sacred Space Music at Hearts of Space Records

References

1982 albums
Constance Demby albums
Hearts of Space Records albums